Up North is a 2018 Nigerian drama film produced by Anakle Films and Inkblot Productions, and directed by Tope Oshin. The screenplay was written by Naz Onuzo and Bunmi Ajakaiye, based on a story from Editi Effiong. It was mainly shot in Bauchi, with a one-week shoot in Lagos.

Cast 
Banky Wellington as Bassey Otuekong
Rahama Sadau as Mariam
Kanayo O. Kanayo as Chief Otuekong
Adesuwa Etomi-Wellington as Zainab
Michelle Dede as Idara Otuekong
Hilda Dokubo as Mrs Otuekong
Ibrahim Suleiman as Sadiq
Rekiya Attah  as Principal Hassan
Akin Lewis as Otunba

See also
 List of Nigerian films of 2018

References

External links
 

2018 films
2018 drama films
2010s adventure drama films
Nigerian adventure drama films
Films set in Northern Nigeria
Films set in Lagos
Films shot in Lagos
2010s English-language films
English-language Nigerian films
Hausa-language films